FG-7142 (ZK-31906) is a drug which acts as a partial inverse agonist at the benzodiazepine allosteric site of the GABAA receptor. It has anorectic, anxiogenic and pro-convulsant effects. It also increases release of acetylcholine and noradrenaline, and improves memory retention in animal studies.

References

Anxiogenics
Beta-Carbolines
Carboxamides
Convulsants
GABAA receptor negative allosteric modulators
Nootropics